The  is a commuter railway line in Kobe, Japan operated by Kobe Electric Railway. It connects central Kobe with its northern suburbs in Kita-ku and Arima Onsen.

Service is divided at Arimaguchi, where most trains from Shinkaichi continue on the Sanda Line, with short-run trains operating between Arimaguchi and Arima Onsen, the line terminus.

History
The entire line opened in 1928,  gauge and electrified at 1500 VDC.

The Mitogawa - Arimaguchi section was duplicated between 1965 and 1966.

Former connecting lines
Arima Onsen station - The 12km line to Sanda on the Fukuchiyama Line was operated by the Arima Railway Co. from 1915 to 1943.

Stations
 S = stop
 ↑ = one direction only
  = pass

Abolished stations
Shin-yu Yaba (神有耶馬) - located between Hiyodorigoe and Suzurandai, abolished on February 15, 1939.
Shin-Arima (新有馬) - located between Arimaguchi and Arima Onsen, suspended on June 15, 1965, and abolished on February 28, 2013.

References

 This article incorporates material from the corresponding article in the Japanese Wikipedia

Transport in Kobe
Railway lines in Japan
Railway lines opened in 1928